As Little As A Look is the debut (and only) solo studio album by Australian artist Matt Moffitt. The album was recorded in London and Belgium with Matt Finish co-founder and Australian drummer John Prior and English producer Nicky Graham in 1985.

The album spawned the singles "Miss This Tonight" and "All That Stuff", both of which peaked inside the Australian top 100.

Track-list 
 Heathen Kind (Moffitt/Glenister)
 By As Little As a Look (Moffitt/Glenister)
 Miss This Tonight (Moffitt/Glenister)
 Thursday (Moffitt/Glenister)
 Overland (Graham/Moffitt)
 All That Stuff (Moffitt/Glenister)
 Save Your Worry (Moffitt)
 BB's (Moffitt)
 Fever Pitch (Moffitt)
 Ocean Chimes (Moffitt/Glenister)
 Light Me Up (Moffitt/Glenister)

Personnel 
 Matt Moffitt - vocals
 John Prior - drum programming
 Rob Fisher - keyboards, bass
 Felix Krish - bass guitar (track 7)
 Pete Glenister - guitar
 Nicky Graham - production, keyboards, bass
 Dale Barlow - saxophone (track 6)
 Wendy Dorsett - backing vocals
 Peter Ashworth - photography
 Green Ink - artwork, design

Charts

References

1986 debut albums
Matt Moffitt albums